Tony Gilham Racing (Team HARD. Racing), competing as RCIB Insurance with Fox Transport, ROKiT Racing with Team HARD. and HUB Financial Solutions with Team HARD. currently, is a British motor racing team based in Dartford, Kent and founded by Tony Gilham. The team raced under the Team HARD. banner in the British Touring Car Championship until the end of 2013. They now compete in the British Touring Car Championship, Volkswagen Racing Cup, Ginetta GT4 Supercup, Mini Challenge UK and the GT Cup series.

British Touring Car Championship

2012–2020
In February 2012, Gilham announced he had purchased a Super 2000 Honda Civic from Team Dynamics. The following month he announced the formation of Tony Gilham Racing which would run the car in the 2012 British Touring Car Championship season under the RCIB Insurance & HARD. banner. Gilham started on pole position for the reversed grid race at Thruxton but having already slipped down to third, he damaged the car and retired from the race. Gilham took the first podium finish for the team at Donington Park in race three after Mat Jackson was disqualified, finishing third behind Gordon Shedden and Jason Plato. Robb Holland took over the car for the meetings at Snetterton and Knockhill. Holland failed to finish his first race when he collided with the Speedworks Motorsport Toyota Avensis of Adam Morgan. Former Formula Renault BARC driver Howard Fuller raced the car in the meetings at Rockingham and Silverstone. He achieved a best result of eleventh in the first and third races at Silverstone. Prior to the final round of the season at Brands Hatch, Tony Gilham Racing bought a full NGTC–spec Vauxhall Insignia from Thorney Motorsport along with an incomplete shell which would be built up over the winter. Gilham raced the Insignia at Brands Hatch and former Ginetta GT Supercup driver Aaron Williamson drove the Honda Civic.

In December 2012, Team HARD. announced the development of an NGTC Volkswagen CC to compete in the 2013 season which would run alongside a pair of Vauxhall Insignias and the S2000 Honda Civic. The team signed series rookie Jack Goff to drive the first of the Insignias later that month. The first of the Volkswagen CC drivers was announced at the beginning of January 2013 with Tom Onslow-Cole joining the team from eBay Motors in a three-year deal. The second Insignia seat was filled by former FIA Formula Two Championship driver James Cole. Robb Holland will return to the team for a minimum of two rounds which do not clash with his drive in the World Touring Car Championship. The team sold their S2000 Honda Civic prior to the start of the 2013 season in order to focus on starting the season with three NGTC cars.  The team ran their cars under two names, the Vauxhall Insignias were run under the RCIB Insurance Racing banner and the Volkswagen CCs were run under the PPCGB.com/Kraftwerk Racing banner.

Howard Fuller  and Robb Holland were due to share the other Volkswagen, however this never occurred and from Snetterton onwards the team entered partnership with Team BMR Restart by supplying them with a NGTC Volkswagen CC (the team had previously been running outdated S2000 machinery). Onslow Cole managed to grab three podiums at Thruxton and Croft while his teammates struggled to make it into the top 10 in their insignias. James Cole left the team in July and he was replaced by Robb Holland. Scottish Legends racer Kieran Gallagher replaced Holland for the Knockhill round, little over a year since Gallagher gained his racing licence. Goff returned for the Rockingham round while Howard Fuller took the second Insignia. Onslow-Cole left the team and joined Motorbase the final three rounds of the season  In the final race of the year at Brands Hatch Jack Goff finished second after battling with reigning champion Gordon Shedden for the lead. The two teams managed to accumulate 4 podiums between them and finish 9th and 11th in the championship respectively.

Before the start of the 2014 British Touring Car Championship season, Tony Gilham Racing merged with Team BMR to form Team BMR Racing. Goff was confirmed as their first driver, racing under the RCIB Insurance Racing banner in a Vauxhall Insignia.

By the mid way point of the 2014 season at Snetterton Warren Scott and his Team BMR racing team had severed all ties with Tony Gilham Racing after purchasing all of the teams assets including the pair of Vauxhall Insignia's and Volkswagen Passat CC's. From that round onwards the team continued to run under the Chrome Edition Restart Racing Banner fielding four Volkswagens for Scott, Alain Menu, Aron Smith and Jack Goff. Tony Gilham and Team Hard re-emerged at the start of the 2015 season with a single car entry after a deal was done with United Autosports to acquire one of their Toyota Avensis' that was previously raced by Frank Wrathall. Scot Kieran Gallagher has raced the Avensis at each round with a string of poor results to date, with the car not even taking to the grid on several occasions, as the team and driver continue to struggle with budget issues.

Cupra Leon (2021–) 
The team will introduce the Cupra brand to the BTCC for the first time in 2021 after announcing Jack Goff, Glynn Geddie and Aron Taylor-Smith will drive three brand new Cupra Leons.

BTCC Results

Britcar Endurance Championship

Ginetta G55 GT4
Team HARD entered Britcar, for the 'Into-the-Night' race at Brands Hatch, at the end of the 2016 season with two Ginetta G55 GT4s. The cars were entered as invitation entries, ineligible to score points, in Class 3, with Darron Lewis and Daniel Wylie alongside Tom Knight and Dan Kirby. Lewis and Wylie qualified 8th on the grid while Knight and Kirby were 11th on row 6. Lewis and Wylie finished the 3-hour race 7th overall with Knight and Kirby finishing 9th.

For 2017, Team HARD made a quadruple car entry, in the Endurance category in Class 3, for the first round at Silverstone, with Simon Rudd and Tom Barley, Darron Lewis and Tom Knight, Angus Dudley and Callum Hawkins-Row and Toby Bearne and Daniel Wylie. At the end of the season, Lewis and Knight were 2nd in the Endurance championship, 19 points behind Witt Gamski and Ross Wylie, Rudd and Barley finished 3rd while Dudley and Hawkins-Row were further behind on points in 5th. In Class 3, Team HARD made it a 1-2-3 in the points standings.

In 2018, the first round at Rockingham saw Team HARD bring in three G55s in Class 3, to compete in the Endurance category, the duo of Simon Rudd and Tom Barley, Darron Lewis and Adam Hatfield and invitation entry of Graham Roberts and Ben Wallace. During the course of the season, there was only one driver change for Simon Rudd, Sam Randon in round 4 at Donington Park. Through the whole season, the car piloted by Hatfield and Lewis had multiple driver changes, in the form of Callum Hawkins-Row, Sam Randon, Angus Dudley, Nick Scott-Dickeson and Ryan Harper-Ellam. The driver changes meant varying positions where the car finished, but with only one non-finish. At the end of the season, Rudd and Barley finished 2nd in the Endurance championship standings overall 12 points behind Matt Greenwood and Sarah Moore, but were 1st in Class 3. The second of Team HARD's cars was 4th overall in the championship 8 points behind Mike McCollum and Sean Cooper and third in Class 3.

The team did not participate in the opening rounds of 2019, only confirming an entry at the end of the season, competing in the 'Into-the-Night' races at Brands Hatch with Nick Scott-Dickeson joined by Steve Chandler and Ben Clayden driving with ex-BTCC driver Michael Epps.

BTCC Cars
In 2017, Adam Hatfield drove an ex-BTCC Volkswagen Passat at Donington Park in round 5, he qualified 24th, finishing 15th in race one but retiring before completing the second 50-minute sprint race. Hatfield competed in the next round at Oulton Park in a Toyota Avensis. He qualified 15th on the grid, finishing the race in 10th place and 2nd in the Sprint category. In the 50-minute Sprint race he placed 5th overall. For the annual 'Into-the-Night' races at Brands Hatch, Jesse Chamberlain and Ben Wallace drove the Avensis, qualifying 23rd on the grid, finishing 14th overall in the first race and 4th overall in the Sprint race.

In 2018, Sam Randon and Michael Crees drove the Avensis again in the night races at Brands Hatch. They qualified 14th on the grid for the race, but retired from the first race due to mechanical issues. They managed to move up from the back of the grid and finished 3rd overall in the Endurance race.

References

External links
 

British Touring Car Championship teams
British auto racing teams
British racecar constructors
Porsche Carrera Cup Great Britain teams
British GT Championship teams
Auto racing teams established in 2012